The red gurnard (Chelidonichthys cuculus), also known as the East Atlantic red gurnard or soldier, is a benthic species of ray-finned fish belonging to the family Triglidae, the gurnards and sea robins. This fish is found in the eastern Atlantic Ocean, including the Mediterranean Sea and the Black Sea.

Taxonomy
The red gurnard was first formally described in 1758 as Trigla cuculus by Carl Linnaeus in the 10th edition of his Systema Naturae with the type locality given as the Mediterranean Sea. In 1925 the American zoologist Henry Weed Fowler classified this species in the monotypic taxon Aspitrigla, a subgenus of Chelidonichthys, and the red gurnard is the type species of the subgenus. The specific name cuculus is Latin for "cuckoo", a name which can be traced as far back as Aristotle, who claimed that gurnards made cuckoo-like noises when taken from the water.

Description
The red gurnard has a large angular head which does not have a deep occipital groove but has a steep snout, which is elongated forward with a flattened, two lobed rostrum covered in denticles. The first dorsal fin contains 9 or 10 spines, the first of which is serrated to the front and the second spine is not elongated. the second dorsal fin has 17 or 19 soft rays while the anal fin contains between 16 and 18 soft rays. The pectoral fins have 2 or 3 enlarged, separate rays. The scales in the lateral line resemble plates having being lengthened vertically. There are no scales on the breast and the front part of the belly. The colour is bright red on the upper body, pale on the lower body with pink pelvic fins. The anal fin is white at its base while the pectoral and dorsal fins are yellowish.

Distribution and habitat

The red gurnard is found in the eastern Atlantic Ocean from southern Scotland, although it has been recorded infrequently from Norway, south to Mauritania, including the Madeira, the Azores and the Canary Islands. It is found throughout the Mediterranean Sea and in the Black Sea. It is typically recorded on habitats dominated by sand or gravel, although it has also been found in rocky and muddy habitats.

Biology
The red gurnard was found, in a study of this species in the Adriatic Sea, to feed almost entirely (more than 90%) on malacostracan crustaceans with fishes, molluscs and echinoderms taken in much smaller amounts. Prey is detected using the enlarged, separated rays of the pectoral fins. This species produces sounds, being noted to croak like a frog. It sometimes aggregates in schools, and it is known to spawn in the summer.

Fisheries
The red gurnard is not commercially exploited in its Atlantic range, although, it may be caught and eaten as bycatch. However, in the Mediterranean, it is of minor commercial interest. Red gurnards are regularly present in fish markets in Spain, Morocco, Italy, Cyprus and Egypt, and sometimes in France,England, Greece and Turkey, although it is rarely marketed in Tunisia. The catch is sold fresh, chilled and frozen.

References

External links

red gurnard
Fish of the East Atlantic
Fish of the Mediterranean Sea
Marine fauna of North Africa
red gurnard
Taxa named by Carl Linnaeus